C/1652 Y1 was a naked-eye comet observed, among others by Jan van Riebeeck. First spotted on December 16, 1652, by Dutch observers at Pernambuco (Brazil).

 the comet was about 280 AU from the Sun (very approximate due to poorly determined orbit).

References

Non-periodic comets
16521216